Sujangarh is a city in the Churu district in the Shekhawati region of Rajasthan, India. Sujangarh lies on the Churu city-Pali Highway (NH 65) and Hanumangarh-Kishangarh Mega Highway. The town is well known for a second Tirupati Balaji Temple.The first one being in Tirumala – the Tirupati Balaji Venkateshwar Mandir. It is the first of its kind built in South Indian style, in Rajasthan. Lord Shiva Temple on Sujangarh Road in Thardaa and Dungar Balaji on Sujangarh - Dungar Balaji Road in Gopalpura are other two nearby Hindu temples that are popular. Sri Devsagar Singhee Jain Mandir at Sujangarh is a century-old Jain Tirth that is located within the town.

Geography

Demographics
, India census, Sujangarh had a population of 101,528; 52,078 males and 49,450 females, giving a sex ratio of 950. The average literacy rate was 74%,  male literacy was 85%, and female literacy was 63%. 14,723 (14.5%) of the population was under 6 years of age.

Notable people

 Mubarak Begum, Playback singer.
 Khemchand Prakash, Musician (Aayega Aane Wala from Mahal 1949)
 Kanhaiyalal Sethia, Rajasthani and Hindi poet.

Civic Administration
Sujangarh has its own assembly constituency, Sujangarh assembly constituency and comes under the Churu constituency for the Lok Sabha. The assembly elect from Sujangarh is Manoj Meghwal from the Indian National Congress.

Education and institutes
Industrial Training Institute- Sujangarh (Churu), is entrusted with the responsibility of providing trained technical manpower for the technological upgrade of industrial production, services, productivity and innovation, contributing to the planned growth of the country's economy.

References

External links 
 http://churu.rajasthan.gov.in/content/raj/churu/en/about-churu/blocks-tehsil-pnchayats.html
 https://rajasthan.gov.in/Pages/default.aspx

Cities and towns in Churu district